Łatacz is a Polish language occupational surname literally meaning "cobbler" or "patcher".
Łatacz or Latacz may refer to:

Joachim Latacz (born 1934), German classical philologist
Ewald Latacz (1885–1953), Silesian politician, and lawyer

See also
 

Occupational surnames
Polish-language surnames